Laclavère Plateau is a plateau,  long and from  wide, rising to  between Misty Pass and Theodolite Hill, Trinity Peninsula, Antarctica. The plateau rises south of Schmidt Peninsula and the Chilean scientific station, Base General Bernardo O'Higgins Riquelme. It was named by the UK Antarctic Place-Names Committee (1963) after French cartographer Georges R. Laclavère, President of the Scientific Committee on Antarctic Research, 1958–63.

Maps
 Trinity Peninsula. Scale 1:250000 topographic map No. 5697. Institut für Angewandte Geodäsie and British Antarctic Survey, 1996.

Central plateaus of Graham Land
North to south:
 Laclavère Plateau
 Louis Philippe Plateau
 Detroit Plateau
 Herbert Plateau
 Foster Plateau
 Forbidden Plateau
 Bruce Plateau
 Avery Plateau
 Hemimont Plateau

References

Plateaus of Antarctica
Landforms of Graham Land
Landforms of Trinity Peninsula